Army Ants are a discontinued fantasy toy soldier line from Hasbro in much the same vein as the M.U.S.C.L.E. and Monster in My Pocket lines. It featured an army of humanoid ants.

Released in 1987, Army Ants were originally released in "squadrons" (sets) of three or eight figures, set on card-backed blister packs. The individual soldiers had various themes, including officers, international soldiers (such as French Foreign Legion soldiers and English guards), and aviators (in the form of flying ants).

Army Ants Roster
Army Ants were organized into two opposing armies: an Orange Army led by "General Patant" and a Blue Army led by "General Mc-Anther". There were 5 sets for each army: 4 of three figures and 1 of eight figures, which also contained the general for the army.

Orange Army
 General Patant's Special Strike Force Team
 General Patant
 Stalker
 Snorkel Head
 Blitz Kreig
 Rambant
 Blighty
 Beau Geste
 Blak Jak
 Assault Team
 Mega-Hurtz
 Road Rash
 Grease Pit
 Sniper Team
 Recoil
 Warpo
 Repeater
 Bazooka Team
 Loadout
 Bug-eye
 Howler
 Aerial Assault Squad
 Reeky
 Windy
 Bullseye

Blue Army
 General Mc-Anther's Special Forces Team
 General Mc-Anther
 Gimme 50
 Semper Fi
 Tail Spin
 Bone Crusher
 Knockdown
 Heave-Ho
 Jagged Tooth
 Mortar Team
 Bunko
 Incoming
 Quick Hit
 Artillery Team
 Sneaky
 Pig Out
 Ozone
 Flame Thrower Squad
 Stabber
 Rip Pin
 Blow Torch
 Bomber Squad
 Razor Beak
 Crossfire
 Snarl

Alternate versions
Army Ants were also sold in Europe under several names. The most documented online is the Italian version called Kombattini (the French version was called Termitors). Kombattini were marketed by GIG, a toy manufacturer that also produced similar toy soldier lines such as Exogini (the Greek version of M.U.S.C.L.E.), and gained great popularity between the 1980s and 1990s, partially due to a particularly successful advertising campaign. Kombattini used the same 40 molds as Army Ants but with several design differences:
 Figurines were painted a single, solid color with no detailing.
 Red Army soldiers were painted iridescent blue, green, or white.
 Blue Army soldiers were painted iridescent black, pink, or gray.
 Both armies also had rare transparent ants.
 Each model of ant was available in all four colors for its army.
 The ants' rubber abdomens (called "ampolla della forza", "ampules of force") were transparent and glittery.

The toys were also sold differently. Instead of cardboard blister packs, they were available in packages of one, buckets of 4, or pyramids of 8 or 14. As for the English version, each figure had a distinct name, but GIG chose to adopt humorous names mangling those of famous people of the time, including politicians, sportsmen and people from the show business (e.g., "Tromba il bomba" for skier Alberto Tomba, "Van Basta il Tosto" for soccer player Marco van Basten, or "Benigno il Commando" for comedian Roberto Benigni).

References

External links
 Army Ants page on Virtual Toy Chest
 Army Ants commercial
 Kombattini index (in Italian)

Hasbro products
Militaria
Toy figurines
1980s toys
Toy animals